Lawrence D. Clark (born July 24, 1945) is a Democratic member of the Kentucky House of Representatives, representing the 46th District since 1984. He is a former Speaker Pro Tempore of the House.

Early life and education
Clark attended Flaget High School. He worked as an electrical apprentice from 1966 to 1970.

Career
Clark has been a representative of the Kentucky House since 1984, and Speaker Pro Tempore since 1993.

Committees
Clark has been a member for the following committees:
Committee On Committees, Member
Elections, Constitutional Amendments and Intergovernmental Affairs, Member
Interim Joint Committee on Economic Development and Tourism, Member
Interim Joint Committee on Licensing and Occupations, Member
Interim Joint Committee on State Government, Member
Interim Joint Committee on Veterans, Military Affairs, and Public Protection, Member
Legislative Research Commission, Member
Licensing and Occupations, Member
Rules, Member
Task Force on Elections, Constitutional Amendments, and Intergovernmental Affairs, Member
Tourism Development and Energy, Member
Veterans, Military Affairs, and Public Safety, Member
Member, Governor's Task Force on Postsecondary Education, 1996
Member, Governor's Tax Policy Commission, 1995
Member, Democratic Executive Finance Committee
Member, Economic Advisory Council, Office of the Mayor of Louisville
Member, Fine Arts Center Commission, Louisville/Jefferson County Cultural Complex Task Force
Co-Chair, Governor's Task Force on Unemployment Insurance
Member, Jefferson County Executive Finance Committee
Member, Kentucky Solar Energy Task Force
Member, Legislative Task Force on the Extension of Water Service, Jefferson County Fire Protection Study Commission

References

External links
Representative Larry Clark (D), Speaker Pro Tem official Kentucky Legislature site
 
 Bills, amendments and roll call votes from KentuckyVotes.org

1945 births
Living people
Democratic Party members of the Kentucky House of Representatives
Politicians from Louisville, Kentucky
21st-century American politicians